Christrian Spescha (born 25 January 1989) is a former Swiss alpine skier who won a FIS Alpine Ski Europa Cup in 2010.

Europa Cup results
Spescha has won an overall Europa Cup.

FIS Alpine Ski Europa Cup
Overall: 2010

References

External links
 
 

1989 births
Living people
Swiss male alpine skiers